TJ Družstevník Veľké Ludince is a Slovak football team, based in the village of Veľké Ludince.

External links 
at velkeludince.sk

References

Football clubs in Slovakia